David Calthorpe (born 17 August 1973) is a former Australian rules footballer who played for Essendon, the Brisbane Lions and the Kangaroos in the Australian Football League (AFL).

Calthorpe was an on-baller and in his first ever State of Origin game for Victoria won the E. J. Whitten Medal. For the Bombers he played 92 games from his debut in 1992, winning a premiership medal in his second season. He was picked up by Brisbane at pick one in the 1999 Pre-Season Draft but only played 9 games for the club before moving to the Kangaroos in 2000 for what turned out to be his final season of football.

He is best remembered for a solo play late in the third quarter of the 1993 AFL Grand Final where he collected the ball from the centre bounce and within 10 seconds had goaled from 55 metres out, effectively killing the game as a contest.

Statistics

|-
|- style="background-color: #EAEAEA"
! scope="row" style="text-align:center" | 1992
|style="text-align:center;"|
| 48 || 2 || 2 || 3 || 9 || 3 || 12 || 0 || 1 || 1.0 || 1.5 || 4.5 || 1.5 || 6.0 || 0.0 || 0.5 || 0
|-
|style="text-align:center;background:#afe6ba;"|1993†
|style="text-align:center;"|
| 48 || 11 || 10 || 14 || 80 || 63 || 143 || 25 || 15 || 0.9 || 1.3 || 7.3 || 5.7 || 13.0 || 2.3 || 1.4 || 0
|- style="background-color: #EAEAEA"
! scope="row" style="text-align:center" | 1994
|style="text-align:center;"|
| 14 || 17 || 13 || 13 || 176 || 113 || 289 || 46 || 33 || 0.8 || 0.8 || 10.4 || 6.6 || 17.0 || 2.7 || 1.9 || 3
|-
! scope="row" style="text-align:center" | 1995
|style="text-align:center;"|
| 14 || 17 || 9 || 10 || 168 || 74 || 242 || 42 || 14 || 0.5 || 0.6 || 9.9 || 4.4 || 14.2 || 2.5 || 0.8 || 3
|- style="background-color: #EAEAEA"
! scope="row" style="text-align:center" | 1996
|style="text-align:center;"|
| 14 || 16 || 7 || 13 || 141 || 50 || 191 || 24 || 19 || 0.4 || 0.8 || 8.8 || 3.1 || 11.9 || 1.5 || 1.2 || 1
|-
! scope="row" style="text-align:center" | 1997
|style="text-align:center;"|
| 14 || 8 || 4 || 3 || 69 || 55 || 124 || 27 || 6 || 0.5 || 0.4 || 8.6 || 6.9 || 15.5 || 3.4 || 0.8 || 0
|- style="background-color: #EAEAEA"
! scope="row" style="text-align:center" | 1998
|style="text-align:center;"|
| 14 || 21 || 13 || 10 || 264 || 112 || 376 || 92 || 24 || 0.6 || 0.5 || 12.6 || 5.3 || 17.9 || 4.4 || 1.1 || 8
|-
! scope="row" style="text-align:center" | 1999
|style="text-align:center;"|
| 48 || 9 || 2 || 0 || 63 || 21 || 84 || 18 || 4 || 0.2 || 0.0 || 7.0 || 2.3 || 9.3 || 2.0 || 0.4 || 0
|- style="background-color: #EAEAEA"
! scope="row" style="text-align:center" | 2000
|style="text-align:center;"|
| 17 || 13 || 10 || 3 || 53 || 43 || 96 || 14 || 19 || 0.8 || 0.2 || 4.1 || 3.3 || 7.4 || 1.1 || 1.5 || 0
|- class="sortbottom"
! colspan=3| Career
! 114
! 70
! 69
! 1023
! 534
! 1557
! 288
! 135
! 0.6
! 0.6
! 9.0
! 4.7
! 13.7
! 2.5
! 1.2
! 15
|}

References

External links

1973 births
Living people
Australian rules footballers from Victoria (Australia)
Essendon Football Club players
Essendon Football Club Premiership players
Brisbane Lions players
North Melbourne Football Club players
Victorian State of Origin players
E. J. Whitten Medal winners
One-time VFL/AFL Premiership players